Dinosaur Land may refer to:

 Dinosaur Land (Rügen), an amusement park with model dinosaurs on the German island of Rügen
 Dinosaur Land (Virginia), an amusement park with model dinosaurs in White Post, Virginia
 The setting of the game Super Mario World

See also
 List of dinosaur parks